Kenneth George Haig (20 February 1879 – 1958) M.R.C.S., L.R.C.P. was an English physician and writer best known for promoting the uric-acid free diet.

Biography

Haig was born at Windsor, Berkshire on 20 February 1879. His father was dietitian and physician Alexander Haig. He married Hester Boyd on 12 October 1909. He was a Captain in the Royal Army Medical Corps during 1914–1920.

Similar to his father, Haig was a proponent of the uric-acid free diet. He wrote about the subject in his book Health Through Diet, which received advice and assistance from his father. Haig argued that excess uric acid was a major cause of disease. For example, he attributed anemia, Bright's disease, cancer, diabetes, heart disease, pneumonia and rheumatism to excess uric acid. Haig stated that the uric-acid free diet greatly improved his health and he had eighteen years of experience on the diet.

The book includes a list of forbidden foods. The uric-acid free diet explained by Haig does not permit foods that are high in purines. On this diet all meat, fish, fowl, egg yolks, beans, lentils, peas, oatmeal, mushrooms, wheat meal, cocoa, coffee and tea are forbidden. The diet allows cheese, milk, cereal foods, rice and some vegetables. Haig wrote that beans, lentils and peas contain large quantities of purines and are poisonous because they produce uric acid. A reviewer in the Journal of the American Medical Association disputed this as "common people have been consuming such substances for ages without showing any ill effects."

A review in The British Medical Journal commented that Haig's uric-acid free diet would be valuable for certain patients but the diet is not "desirable or suitable for general adoption, or that its neglect is accountable for all the diseases he enumerates." A negative review in The Journal of Hygiene stated that the diet is "so singularly unattractive that apart from faddists few persons are likely to be converted to its use, even if that were desirable." In contrast, it was positively reviewed in the Nature journal for "approach[ing] the subject with such wholehearted enthusiasm that he equals, if not excels, that of his father, whose work he continues and extends."

Selected publications

Uric Acid in the Clinic (with Alexander Haig, 1910)
Health Through Diet: A Practical Guide to the Uric-Acid-Free Diet (with the advice and assistance of Alexander Haig, 1913)

Quotes

References

1879 births
1958 deaths
19th-century English medical doctors
20th-century English medical doctors
British vegetarianism activists
English medical writers
People from Windsor, Berkshire
Royal Army Medical Corps officers
Tea critics
British Army personnel of World War I
Military personnel from Berkshire